Olive Branch is a city in DeSoto County, Mississippi, United States.   As of the 2020 census, the population is 39,711. Olive Branch is part of the Memphis Metropolitan Statistical Area, a region that consists of three counties in southwest Tennessee, five counties in northwest Mississippi, and two counties in eastern Arkansas. Olive Branch was the fastest growing city in the United States, with a growth rate of 838% as of 2010 in a thirty year time frame. Along with other rapidly growing places in DeSoto County, Olive Branch attributes most of its growth and development to the exodus of large numbers of families from central Memphis.

History

The first permanent Anglo settlers in the area were Stephen Flinn and his wife's brother-in-law, Milton Blocker. On April 13, 1836, they purchased  of land – known as Sections 34 and 35 – in newly created DeSoto County from Chickasaw chief Lush-Pun-Tubby for $1,600. Flinn conveyed the land to Blocker for $6,400 in 1840. A small community initially known as "Cowpens" sprang up in the early 1840s. The name was changed to "Watson's Crossroads" in 1842. In 1846, when a post office was established, the name was changed again to "Olive Branch". Frances Wilson Blocker, a descendant of one of the community's founders, suggested the name as a way to symbolize the biblical story of a dove bringing a branch to Noah. With the exception of a few skirmishes occurring in an area southwest of the community, Olive Branch escaped much of the destruction and violence during the Civil War.

Olive Branch was incorporated as a town on May 1, 1874. Ben Wesson was elected as the first mayor. At the first census conducted after incorporation in 1880, the population was 73. Kansas City, Memphis & Birmingham built a railroad line through Olive Branch in 1885, connecting the town to Memphis and Birmingham. The town was officially designated a village on March 6, 1888.

At the turn of the 20th century, nearly 200 people lived in Olive Branch. In the ensuing years, several modern amenities were introduced in the village, including the first cotton gin (1910), a public water system (1922), and electrical service (1927). T.H. Norvell's cheese plant (at the side of present-day BancorpSouth) opened in 1929, becoming the first major industry in Olive Branch. A public sewer system was built, and local streets were paved . The village experienced modest growth during the next few decades, rising from 441 in the 1940 census, to 534 in 1950, and 642 in 1960. Growth accelerated in the 1960s, and by 1970 the population had more than doubled to 1,513. In 1971, a site located a few miles from downtown Olive Branch was chosen as the home of Holiday Inn University and Conference Center. Simultaneous with construction of the university, Holiday Inn began work on a  industrial park. This was followed by the opening of Olive Branch Airport in January 1973. U.S. Highway 78 was built through Olive Branch in 1974. Such developments and infrastructure improvements brought an influx of jobs, industries, and people to DeSoto County and Olive Branch.

The 1990s were a period of explosive growth in the city; 3,567 people lived in Olive Branch at the 1990 census. In 1996, a land annexation to the west doubled the city's total land area. By 2000, the population had risen to 21,054, a 490 percent increase over the 1990 figure.

Geography and climate
Olive Branch is located in northeastern DeSoto County, at the junction of U.S. Route 78, and State Highways 302 (known locally as Goodman Road) and 305 (Germantown Road/Cockrum Street).

The city's northern border is the Mississippi/Tennessee state line. The Memphis city limits touch the western portion of Olive Branch's northern border. The city of Southaven, Mississippi, borders Olive Branch on the west, and unincorporated areas border the city to the east and south.

Demographics

2020 census

As of the 2020 United States Census, there were 39,711 people, 13,252 households, and 9,645 families residing in the city.

2010 census
As of the census of 2010, there were 33,484 people. The racial makeup of the city was 70.2% White, 23.8% African American, 0.5% Native American, 1.6% Asian,  and Hispanic or Latino people were 4.2% of the population. The median income for a household in the city was $68,287, and the median income for a family was $75,107.

Economy
Many locally owned, small businesses have been operating in Olive Branch for several decades. Examples are Old Style Barbecue and Olive Branch Printing. Several regional businesses, such as Bancorpsouth and Holiday Inn, are also located in the area. In 2003 Memphis lost its only permanent indoor ice rink with the closure of the troubled Mall of Memphis. A new rink opened in Olive Branch in August 2011.

Education
Olive Branch is served by the DeSoto County School District.
Private schools include:
Northpoint Christian School
Cross Creek Christian Academy
 Park Academy School
 Desoto County Academy

Infrastructure

Transportation

Highways
Highway 78, which turns into Lamar Avenue after crossing the border in Memphis, Mississippi Highway 302 (MS-302/Goodman Road), and Mississippi Highway 305 (Cockrum Road, Germantown Road) are the main thoroughfares in the Olive Branch area.

Railroad
A railroad line to Birmingham from Memphis runs through Olive Branch. It is used by BNSF.

Airport
Olive Branch is served by Olive Branch Airport. The closest airport with commercial air service is Memphis International Airport, which is about 30 minutes by car from Olive Branch.

Notable people
 Daren Bates, Tennessee Titans linebacker
 Charles Boyce, cartoonist, creator of Compu-toon
 Carl Byrum, Buffalo Bills running back
 Shon Coleman, Cleveland Browns offensive tackle
 Jalen Collins, Atlanta Falcons cornerback
 Ed Easley, baseball player, St. Louis Cardinals catcher
 Andy Fletcher, Major League Baseball umpire
 Mark Guy, football player
 Ricky Stenhouse Jr., NASCAR driver, Daytona 500 winner
 Marko Stunt, All Elite Wrestling professional wrestler
 K. J. Wright, Seattle Seahawks linebacker

See also

 Milwaukee Electric Tool Corporation

References

External links

 City of Olive Branch official website
 Olive Branch Chamber of Commerce
 Olive Branch Old Towne
 Wesson House 
 Information for Olive Branch and Surrounding Cities

Cities in Mississippi
Cities in DeSoto County, Mississippi
Memphis metropolitan area